
The following is a list of Playboy Playmates of 1984, the 30th anniversary year of the publication.  Playboy magazine names their Playmate of the Month each month throughout the year.

January

Penny Baker (born October 5, 1965) is an American model and actress. After being interviewed in Chicago, she was chosen as Playboys Playmate of the Month for January 1984, the 30th Anniversary Playmate. Her photos were shot by Arny Freytag in New York City, Buffalo, and Los Angeles when she was 17, with written permission from her parents. Her pictorial was titled "Lucky Penny" and it reported her age as 18.

February

Justine Greiner (born November 19, 1963) is a former American model. She was chosen as Playboys Playmate of the Month for February 1984. Her sister is Corinne Lee, poet and author of PYX, winner of the 2004 National Poetry Series.

March

Dona L. Speir (born February 7, 1964) is an American model and B movie actress. She was chosen as Playboy's Playmate of the Month for March 1984. Her centerfold was photographed by Arny Freytag.  Speir  studied film acting with R. J. Adams at The Actors Workshop, Orange County, and went on to star in several sexploitation–action films by Andy Sidaris, including Hard Hunted (1993).

April

Lesa Ann Pedriana (born November 24, 1962, in Milwaukee, Wisconsin) is an American model and actress. She was Playboy magazine's Playmate of the Month for its April 1984 issue. Her centerfold was photographed by Stephen Wayda.

May

Patty Duffek (born August 27, 1963) is an American model and actress. She was chosen as Playboy's Playmate of the Month for May 1984.

June

Tricia Lange (born April 24, 1957) is an American model and actress. She was Playboy magazine's Playmate of the Month for its June 1984 issue. Her centerfold was photographed by Richard Fegley.

July

Liz Stewart (born July 3, 1961) is an American interior designer, model, and actress. She was chosen as Playboy's Playmate of the Month for July 1984.

August

Suzi Schott (born July 19, 1961) is an American model and actress. She was chosen as Playboys Playmate of the Month for August 1984.
Her centerfold was photographed by David Mecey.

September

Kimberly Evenson (born November 3, 1962, in Bremerhaven, Germany) is an American model and actress. She was Playboy magazine's Playmate of the Month for its September 1984 issue. Her centerfold was photographed by Arny Freytag. She also appeared in the 1985 teen sex comedies The Big Bet and
Porky's Revenge!.

October

Debi Nicolle Johnson (born March 13, 1958) is an American model and actress. She was chosen as Playboys Playmate of the Month for October 1984.

November

Roberta Vasquez (born February 13, 1963) is an American model and B movie actress. She was Playboys Playmate of the Month for November 1984. Vasquez went on to star in several sexploitation–action films in the late-1980s and early-1990s written and directed by Andy Sidaris. She has worked as a California State Police officer as well as playing an officer in the 1990 Clint Eastwood buddy cop film, The Rookie. She later went back to school and, in 1997, was enrolled at Santa Monica College, taking classes in biology and other subjects.  She's a mortgage broker in Los Angeles and has a son and a daughter.

December

Karen Velez (born January 27, 1961) is a Puerto Rican-American model. She was Playboy magazine's Playmate of the Month for December 1984, and was selected Playmate of the Year for 1985. She was the cover model for the maiden issue of Playmate Review.

She was married to Lee Majors from 1988 to 1994. The marriage produced one daughter, Nikki Majors, and twin sons, Dane Majors and Trey Majors. Nikki Majors posed for the Playboy Cyber Club pictorial called "Playmate Daughters" in March 2008.

See also
 List of people in Playboy 1980–1989

References

1984-related lists
1984
Playmates Of 1984